The Russian National Freestyle Wrestling Championships 2019 (also known as the Russian Nationals 2019) was held in Sochi, Krasnodar Krai by the Russian Wrestling Federation at the Iceberg Skating Palace between 5 July to 7 July 2019.

All of the members of the European Games 2019 were released from Russian Nationals (Zaur Uguev, Akhmed Chakaev, Zaurbek Sidakov, Dauren Kurugliev, Abdulrashid Sadulaev and Anzor Khizriev). They faced Russian National champions for making World Team.

Medal table

Men's freestyle

See also 

2018 Russian National Freestyle Wrestling Championships
2017 Russian National Freestyle Wrestling Championships
2016 Russian National Freestyle Wrestling Championships
2015 Russian National Freestyle Wrestling Championships
Soviet and Russian results in men's freestyle wrestling

References 

Russian National Freestyle Wrestling Championships
Sport in Sochi
2019 in sport wrestling
2019 in Russian sport
Wrestling